Jetti Veera Raghavulu (1931 – 7 June 2013), better known as J. V. Raghavulu, was an eminent Indian music director and playback singer. He started as playback singer and became a music director after the sudden death of Ghantasala. He made his screen debut in Drohi (1970), a film by Suresh Productions. He scored music to about 172 films.

Career
He belonged to an agricultural family in Ramachandrapuram, East Godavari district. His parents were Veeraswami Naidu and Adilaxmi. He was one of the six siblings. He learned acting and singing from Bhadracharyulu who used to organize Harischandra play. He gave him chance to act as Lohitasudu in the play. He used to study in the school and act in the plays touring different places. Famous poets Indraganti Hanumachastri and Vedula Satyanarayana Sastry were his school teachers. Their poems used to be broadcast in All India Radio, Vijayawada. They encouraged him to sing these poems. He tuned and voiced many songs written by them and other writers in "Geetavali" programme. In one of the recording sessions, popular singer Ghantasala heard him singing a light song. Impressed by his voice, he invited Raghavulu to the films. He completed S.S.L.C.

Leaving studies and without informing the parents, he left home, reached Madras and worked under Ghantasala for long time. He was there with him from early morning to late night learning the nuances of playback singing and composing music. Ghantasala used to look after him as his son. He sang "Baito Baito Pellikodaka" in Pelli Sandadi (1959) film for Chalam. He used to look after the composition of the songs for many films. He also worked with K. V. Mahadevan and M. S. Viswanathan for sometime.

Vadde Brothers(Sobhanadri,Ramesh(Father of Hero Vadde Naveen),Kishore) under "Vijaya Madhavi Pictures/Combines" banner as Production house made J. V. Raghavulu their "Aasthana Sangeeta Darshakudu" (Music Director of House) beginning with Aatmiyudu film in 1977 and continued through Katakataala Rudraiah , Rangoon Rowdy, Bebbuli till 1982 Bobbili Puli and further.

He composed thousands of songs. His memorable songs include Janani Janmabhoomischa (Bobbili Puli), Veena Naadi Teega Needi Teegachatu Raagamundi, Tarangini O Tarangini, Ee Jeevana Tarangalalo (Jeevana Tarangalu) and many others.

He was married to Ramanamma. They had four sons (Venkateswar Rao, Bhaskar, Shyam Kumar and Ravi Kumar) and a daughter (Lakshmi). Ravi Raghav has also worked as a music composer, working for the low budget Tamil films, Villalan, Muthal Thagaval Arikkai and En Oviya.

Filmography

As a playback singer

As an assistant music director
 1971 Prema Nagar

As a music director
Telugu
 1969 Bommalu Cheppina Katha (along with Master Venu)
 1970 Drohi
 1973 Jeevana Tarangalu
 1974 Dorababu
 1976 Aadavaallu Apanindalu
 1977 Aatmeeyudu
 1977 Bhale Alludu
 1978 Katakataala Rudraiah
 1979 Evvadabba Sommu
 1979 Naa Illu Naa Vaallu
 1979 Rangoon Rowdy
 1979 Kothala Raayudu
 1980 Shivamettina Satyam
 1980 BebbuliBebbuli
 1980 Samsara Bandham
 1980 Love in Singapore
 1980 Mogudu Kaavali
 1981 Shri Anjaneya Charitra
 1982 Bobbili Puli
 1982 Kalahala Kapuram
 1982 Eenadu
 1982 Intlo Ramayya Veedhilo Krishnayya
 1982 Tarangini
 1983 Mukku Pudaka
 1983 Police Venkataswamy
 1983 Maa Inti Premayanam
 1983 Simhapuri Simham
 1983 Praja Rajyam
 1984 Babulugaadi Debba
 1984 Raraju
 1984 Bharatamlo Shankharavam
 1984 Devanthakudu
 1985 Intiko Rudramma
 1985 TirugubatuTirugubatu
 1985 Kalyana Tilakam
 1986 Ravana Brahma
 1987 Brahma Nayudu
 1987 Viswanatha Nayakudu
 1987 Chaitanya Ratham
 1989 Balipeethampai Bharata Naari
 1989 Chalaki Mogudu Chadastapu Pellam
 1990 20va Sathabdam
 1991 Iddaru Pellala Muddula Police
 1991 Edurinti Mogudu Pakkinti Pellam
 1993 Sarasaala Soggaadu
 1994 Brahmachari Mogudu
 1996 Ooha
 1986 Dharmapeetham Daddarillindi

Tamil
 1972 Kadhalikka Vanga

References

External links
 
 Picture gallery of honouring J.V.Raghavulu.
 J V Raghavulu No More

1931 births
2013 deaths
Indian male composers
Telugu playback singers
Telugu film score composers
Tamil film score composers
People from East Godavari district
Film musicians from Andhra Pradesh
Singers from Andhra Pradesh
20th-century Indian singers
20th-century Indian composers
Male film score composers
20th-century Indian male singers